Bouchardiidae is a family of brachiopods belonging to the order Terebratulida.

Genera:
 †Australiarcula Elliott, 1960
 †Bouchardia Davidson, 1850
 †Bouchardiella Doello-Jurado, 1922
 †Neobouchardia Thomson, 1927

References

Terebratulida